Trachyte Hill is a prominent hill, 470 m, just south of Shell Glacier in the center of the ice-free area on the lower west slopes of Mount Bird on Ross Island. Mapped and so named by the New Zealand Geological Survey Antarctic Expedition (NZGSAE), 1958–59, because of the rock type composing the hill.

Hills of Ross Island